Koudougou is the name of three clustered villages in western Ivory Coast. They in the sub-prefecture of Vavoua, Vavoua Department, Haut-Sassandra Region, Sassandra-Marahoué District. The villages are named Koudougou 1, Koudougou 2, and Koudougou 3, and are each separated by a few kilometres.

Koudougou was a commune until March 2012, when it became one of 1126 communes nationwide that were abolished.

Notes

Former communes of Ivory Coast
Populated places in Sassandra-Marahoué District
Populated places in Haut-Sassandra